Hamud, also known as Roger Hamut, was an Emir of Sicily. He ruled from 1068 to 1087.

References 

 Michele Amari, Storia dei Musulmani di Sicilia, Catane, 1939

1086 deaths
11th-century Arabs
Emirs of Sicily
Year of birth unknown
Slave owners